Kldekari can mean:

 Kldekari (duchy), a duchy in Georgia in 876-1103
 Kldekari (mountain), a mountain in Georgia
 Kldekari (village), a village in Georgia